Lich Lords is an adventure for fantasy role-playing games published by Mayfair Games in 1985.

Contents
Lich Lords is a scenario for character levels 12-16 involving an expedition into the catacombs of the buried city of Ool, accompanying a horrid group of rebel liches who want to overthrow their king.  It includes new rules for wishes, high-level magic, and liches.

Publication history
Lich Lords was written by Lynn Sellers, with a cover by Frank Frazetta, and was published by Mayfair Games in 1985 as a 32-page book with a removable cardstock map screen.

Reception
Lawrence Schick, in his book Heroic Worlds called the adventure "Nice work if you can get it."

Reviews

References

Fantasy role-playing game adventures
Role Aids
Role-playing game supplements introduced in 1985